Hazem Naw (born 1 January 2000) is a Syrian tennis player.

Naw has a career high ATP singles ranking of 594 achieved on 3 October 2022. He also has a career high ATP doubles ranking of 753 achieved on 20 June 2022.

Naw represents Syria at the Davis Cup, where he has a W/L record of 2–3.

Due to the Syrian Civil War, Naw was forced out of Aleppo and moved to Beirut, Lebanon, but now plays tennis for local leagues in Germany.

After a short junior career, Naw began to play ITF events in both the singles and doubles draw. In August 2021, he received a wildcard into the doubles draw of the 2021 Platzmann-Sauerland Open, a Challenger event in Germany which he played alongside former top-100 player Dustin Brown.

Naw is the younger brother of fellow tennis player Amer Naow.

Challenger and World Tennis Tour finals

Singles: 3 (1–2)

Doubles: 4 (2–2)

References

External links
 
 
 

2000 births
Living people
Syrian male tennis players
Sportspeople from Aleppo